HMS Prince of Wales (R09) is the second  of the Royal Navy. Unlike most large aircraft carriers, Prince of Wales is not fitted with catapults and arrestor wires, and is instead designed to operate STOVL aircraft; the ship is currently planned to carry up to 48 F-35B Lightning II stealth multirole fighters and Merlin helicopters for airborne early warning and anti-submarine warfare, although in surge conditions the class is capable of supporting 70+ F-35B. The design emphasises flexibility, with accommodation for 250 Royal Marines and the ability to support them with attack helicopters and troop transports up to and larger than Chinook size.

The completed Prince of Wales began sea trials in September 2019 and first arrived at her new home base of HMNB Portsmouth in November 2019. The ship was formally commissioned into the Royal Navy at a ceremony in Portsmouth on 10 December 2019. She is the eighth Royal Navy ship to have the name . Construction of the ship began in 2011 at Rosyth Dockyard and ended with launch on 21 December 2017. She was handed over to the Royal Navy in 2019. In May 2020, Prince of Wales experienced flooding which the Royal Navy described as "minor". This was followed by more significant flooding in October 2020 which caused damage to her electrical cabling. Prince of Wales departed Portsmouth Naval Base on sea trials on 30 April 2021. In October 2021, the Royal Navy declared the ship as fully operational.

When on operations, Prince of Wales will form a central part of a UK Carrier Strike Group, comprising escorts and support ships, with the aim to facilitate carrier-enabled power projection.

Design and construction

Much like her sister ship Queen Elizabeth, the original 2008 design of Prince of Wales envisaged flying F-35B Lightning II Short Take-Off and Vertical Landing (STOVL) jets from a ski-jump ramp. However, in May 2010, the government published its long-awaited Strategic Defence and Security Review (SDSR), which stated that Prince of Wales would be converted to a Catapult Assisted Take-Off But Arrested Recovery (CATOBAR) configuration, operating the F-35C. An 18-month study commenced into the conversion but ultimately found that it would cause severe cost implications and delays. In May 2012, the government announced it would be reversing its decision to convert Prince of Wales and that the ship would be built to its original STOVL design.

The SDSR also stipulated that the UK only required one aircraft carrier, however penalty clauses in the contract meant that cancelling Prince of Wales would be more expensive than building her. Instead, the government planned to construct Prince of Wales and then either place her into extended readiness or have her sold to an ally. Contrary to this, in 2012, the Royal Navy published its annual yearbook, titled A Global Force 2012/13, which stated that both carriers are "likely to be commissioned and may even be capable of operating together".

Prince of Wales was assembled at Rosyth from 52 blocks built by six shipyards around the UK. Construction began on 26 May 2011 with the first steel being cut at Govan shipyard by Defence Secretary Liam Fox. In September 2014, Prince of Wales reached a final assembly phase when hull blocks LB02 and LB03 were floated into 1 Dock of Rosyth dockyard, Scotland.

During the 2014 NATO Summit in Wales, Prime Minister David Cameron announced that Prince of Wales would be brought into active service, rather than sold off or mothballed. This was later confirmed in the government's 2015 Strategic Defence and Security Review.

In April 2016, the ship was said to be around 80% structurally complete. On 1 September 2017 HMS Prince of Wales most senior officer, Captain Ian Groom, confirmed that the carrier was now essential to fulfilling the Royal Navy's 'full carrier strike capability.'

Sea trials
Prince of Wales was formally named on 8 September 2017 at Rosyth dockyard by Camilla, Queen Consort (then the Duchess of Rothesay). On 21 December 2017, Prince of Wales was floated out of Rosyth drydock #1 for the first time and manoeuvred to a nearby jetty for fitting-out and further systems integration. A Merlin Mk2 helicopter landed and took off six times on her flight deck on 23 September 2019.

The Prince of Wales was due to commence sea trials in 2019 with a view to being commissioned in late 2019. As such, the ship left the fitting out basin at Rosyth for the first time on 20 September 2019; initially she remained anchored in the Firth of Forth, undertaking initial engine and system tests, and waiting for the tide to allow her to pass under the bridges crossing the firth. HMS Prince of Wales sailed under the Firth of Forth bridges on 22 September 2019 and began sea trials.

On 16 November 2019, Prince of Wales arrived at her home base of Portsmouth for the first time, berthing at Princess Royal Jetty. The ship was formally commissioned into the Royal Navy at a ceremony in Portsmouth on 10 December 2019. She is expected to be fully ready for front-line duties around the globe from 2023.

On 28 February 2020, Prince of Wales arrived in her affiliated city of Liverpool for the first time on a week-long visit.

In May 2020, Prince of Wales experienced flooding which the Royal Navy described as "minor". This was followed by more significant flooding from the fire control system in October 2020 which caused damage to her electrical cabling. She was confined to docks where she remained for almost eight months whilst repairs were made. Her long-planned deployment to the United States to undertake her first F-35B trials was cancelled. During 2020 Prince of Wales was at sea just 30 days, compared to 115 days for Queen Elizabeth. Following repair Prince of Wales departed Portsmouth Naval Base to resume sea trials on 30 April 2021. In October 2021, the Royal Navy declared the ship as fully operational.

Aircraft 

The two ships of the Queen Elizabeth class are each expected to be capable of carrying forty aircraft, a maximum of 36 Lockheed Martin F-35B Lightning II stealth multirole fighters and four AgustaWestland Merlin helicopters. The 2010 SDSR anticipated the routine deployment of twelve F-35Bs, but a typical warload will be 24 F-35Bs and some helicopters. These could be a Maritime Force Protection package of nine anti-submarine Merlin HM2 and five Merlin Crowsnest for airborne early warning; alternatively a "littoral manoeuvre" package could potentially include a mix of Royal Navy Commando Helicopter Force Merlin HC4, AgustaWestland Wildcat AH1, RAF Boeing Chinook transports, and Army Air Corps AgustaWestland Apache AH.1 attack helicopters. In 2022, it was reported that initially five Merlins will be equipped with Crowsnest, and that three of these will normally be assigned to the "high readiness" aircraft carrier.  six landing spots are planned, but the deck could be marked out for the operation of ten medium helicopters at once, allowing the lift of a company of 250 troops. The hangars are designed for CH-47 Chinook operations without blade folding and for the Bell Boeing V-22 Osprey tiltrotor, whilst the aircraft lifts can accommodate two Chinooks with unfolded blades.

Passenger/crew transfer boats

The two ships of the Queen Elizabeth class will each carry four PTBs made by Blyth-based company Alnmaritec. To enable the craft to fit into the docking area the navigation and radar masts are fitted with Linak actuators so that they can be lowered automatically from the command console. The enclosed cabin is heated and there is a set of heads forward.

Weapons systems
Defensive weapons include the Phalanx Close-In Weapons System for anti-aircraft and anti-missile defence and Miniguns for use against fast attack craft. The 30mm Automated Small Calibre Guns are fitted for but not with, and not carried as of 2021.

Replica bell from predecessor

The original, raised in 2002 and currently residing at the National Museum of the Royal Navy location at the Portsmouth Historic Dockyard, was surveyed as part of the process.

Cammell Laird were able to contact Utley Offshore in St Helens, the foundry that made the original bell still had the original pattern based on the 1908 Admiralty design. Compared to the bronze or bell metal that is used in most modern ship bells, specially sourced nickel silver was used for authenticity. The engraving was done by Shawcross in Birkenhead, while Cammell Laird shipwrights constructed the hardwood base. Cammell Laird COO Tony Graham presented the finished replica to commanding officer Captain Darren Houston during the ship's week-long visit to Liverpool in March 2020.

Name

The Queen Elizabeth-class carrier is the eighth , named after the title traditionally granted to the heir apparent of the British monarch. The name was announced at the same time as that of her sister ship .

The decommissioning of  under the SDSR in 2010 led to an unsuccessful campaign for one of the new aircraft carriers to receive that name.

Prince of Wales was formally named on 8 September 2017 at Rosyth Dockyard on the Firth of Forth at Rosyth, Fife, Scotland by the then-Duchess of Rothesay, now Camilla, Queen Consort.

Operational history 
After being declared fully operational in October 2021, Prince of Wales participated in an international exercise off the coast of Scotland. This involved joint operations with her sister ship HMS Queen Elizabeth.

NATO command ship 
On 1 January 2022, Prince of Wales took over the role of command ship for NATO's maritime high readiness force from the French Navy. The ship will spend the next twelve months supporting NATO exercises in the Arctic, Baltic and Mediterranean. Her first exercise in this role was Cold Response 22, a Norwegian-led exercise which is designed to test her crew in this role. Later in the year, she passed over the role to Turkey.

2022 starboard propeller shaft external coupling malfunction 

On 27 August 2022, Prince of Wales departed HMNB Portsmouth to undertake training exercises with the US Navy, the Royal Canadian Navy, and United States Marine Corps, and to host the Atlantic Future Forum trade and economic conference in New York. On 29 August, after suffering mechanical problems in the UK's South Coast Exercise area the ship proceeded to anchor in the Solent off the Isle of Wight. It was reported that an external coupling that connects the outer propeller shaft to the drive shaft from the propulsion motors had failed. Rear Admiral Steve Moorhouse, Director of Force Generation, confirmed "significant damage to the shaft and the propeller and some superficial damage to the rudder. There is no damage to the rest of the ship". She arrived in Rosyth for repairs on 12 October 2022 and is expected to return to Portsmouth in spring 2023 following completion of repair work.

Affiliations
Liverpool
Bristol
Worshipful Company of Goldsmiths
Welsh Guards
The Royal Lancers
No. 27 Squadron RAF
RNRMC and Greenwich Hospital

See also
 Future of the Royal Navy

Notes

References

External links

 

Queen Elizabeth-class aircraft carriers
2017 ships
Aircraft carriers of the United Kingdom
Ships built in Scotland